Bitis xeropaga, commonly known as the desert mountain adder or Lüderitz dwarf viper, is a viper species found in southern Namibia and northwestern Cape Province in South Africa. Like all other vipers, it is venomous. No subspecies are currently recognized.

Description

Geographic range
Northwestern Cape Province in South Africa and the arid mountains of the lower Orange River basin, north into southern Namibia and Great Namaqualand as far as Aus is the range for this snake.

The type locality given is "Dreigratberg on north bank of Orange River, Lüderitz district, South West Africa [Namibia] (16°52' E, 28°05' S, alt. about 300 m [980 ft])".

References

Further reading
Branch, Bill. 2004. Field Guide to Snakes and Other Reptiles of Southern Africa. Third Revised edition, Second impression. Sanibel Island, Florida: Ralph Curtis Books. 399 pp. . (Bitis xeropaga, p. 117 + Plate 13).
Haacke WD. "Description of a new adder (Viperidae, Reptilia) from Southern Africa, with a discussion of related forms." Cimbebasia, Series A 4 (5): 115-128. (Bitis xeropaga, new species).

External links

xeropaga
Snakes of Africa
Reptiles of Namibia
Reptiles of South Africa
Reptiles described in 1975